Joseph Lucien Jean Gonzague DeBlois (born June 21, 1957) is a Canadian former professional ice hockey right wing / centre. He featured in the 1979 Stanley Cup Finals with the New York Rangers and the 1986 Stanley Cup Finals with the Montreal Canadiens.

Career
Born in Joliette, Quebec, DeBlois was selected in the 1977 NHL Entry Draft by the New York Rangers in the first round, eighth overall. He was chosen over Mike Bossy by Rangers' general manager John Ferguson, Sr. because "Bossy didn't check enough for the NHL." DeBlois was a top Canadian major junior player in the mid-seventies, where he tallied excellent numbers with the Sorel Black Hawks. He also won the Michel Brière Memorial Trophy as the league MVP during his last junior season in the Quebec Major Junior Hockey League.

In his National Hockey League (NHL) career he played for six teams, the New York Rangers (1977–1979 and 1986–1989), Colorado Rockies (1979–1981), Winnipeg Jets (1981–1984 and 1992), Montreal Canadiens (1984–1986), Quebec Nordiques (1989–1990) and Toronto Maple Leafs (1990–1992). He won a Stanley Cup in 1986 with the Canadiens and also participated in the Stanley Cup Final in 1979 with the Rangers. During his career, DeBlois captained the Jets for two seasons and was an assistant for others (Montreal, New York and Winnipeg). He scored his 200th NHL career goal in the 1986–87 season against his former team, the Montreal Canadiens.

After his playing career, he became a broadcaster for RDS, later becoming an amateur scout for the Nordiques and later was added to a six-man coaching roster under Pierre Pagé with the same team in the spring of 1993 (André Savard, Don Jackson, Jacques Cloutier, Clément Jodoin, and DeBlois). He was the original coach and general manager of Moncton's first QMJHL franchise in 1995–1996, the Moncton Alpines. DeBlois later became an assistant coach with the Kansas City Blades in the International Hockey League (IHL) for two seasons.

Following his stint in the IHL, he was hired as a professional scout for the Mighty Ducks of Anaheim from 1998 to 2005 and later worked as a scout with the Vancouver Canucks from 2005 to 2016.

DeBlois currently resides in Montreal. He has three sons; Christian, Simon (twins) and Dominic. Dominic DeBlois, the youngest, played in the QMJHL during four seasons for Chicoutimi and Rouyn-Noranda where he became team captain his last two years of eligibility.

Career statistics

Regular season and playoffs

International

References

External links

1957 births
Anaheim Ducks scouts
Canadian ice hockey right wingers
Colorado Rockies (NHL) players
Ice hockey people from Quebec
Living people
Moncton Alpines coaches
Montreal Canadiens players
National Hockey League first-round draft picks
New Haven Nighthawks players
New York Rangers draft picks
New York Rangers players
People from Joliette
Quebec Nordiques (WHA) draft picks
Quebec Nordiques players
Sorel Éperviers players
Stanley Cup champions
Toronto Maple Leafs players
Vancouver Canucks scouts
Winnipeg Jets (1972–1996) captains
Winnipeg Jets (1979–1996) players
World Hockey Association first round draft picks
Canadian ice hockey coaches